Javier "Javi" Márquez Moreno (born 11 May 1986) is a Spanish former professional footballer who played as a central midfielder.

Club career

Espanyol
Born in Barcelona, Catalonia, Márquez was a product of hometown RCD Espanyol's youth system. He was promoted to the first team for the 2009–10 season, making his La Liga debut on 19 September by playing 30 minutes at Deportivo de La Coruña for a 3–2 win, after coming on as a substitute for Ben Sahar. 

Márquez quickly established himself in the first team and, on 20 December 2009, scored his first goal in a 2–0 home win against UD Almería. However, his campaign ended prematurely in March 2010 after he broke his leg in a match with Sevilla FC.

Márquez recovered fully for 2010–11, being an undisputed starter for the Mauricio Pochettino-led side while partnering another Espanyol youth graduate, Raúl Baena, in central midfield. However, after recovering from another injury, he was deemed surplus to requirements by the manager, and chose not to renew his contract.

Mallorca
On 30 June 2012, Márquez joined RCD Mallorca as Sergio Tejera moved in the opposite direction. He made his official debut precisely against his former side, starting and playing 54 minutes in the 2–1 home win.

Márquez' spell at the Iberostar Stadium was curtailed by an injury to his left ankle, and his team also suffered relegation.

Granada
In the summer of 2014, Márquez signed a four-year contract for Granada CF after a season-long spell at fellow league club Elche CF. He appeared in 25 games – 15 starts – in his first year, as the Andalusians narrowly retained their status.

Márquez was released in late January 2017, aged 30.

New York Cosmos
On 24 February 2017, the New York Cosmos announced that they had signed Márquez for the 2017 campaign. He scored his first goal for his new team on 22 April, in a 1–1 home draw against the Jacksonville Armada FC.

Gimnàstic
On 8 January 2018, free agent Márquez agreed to a two-and-a-half-year deal at Gimnàstic de Tarragona in the Segunda División. In November 2020, the 34-year-old announced his retirement.

Personal life
In March 2016, Márquez became the father of a baby boy. As a deference to his wife, he named him Modric after the Croatian footballer.

References

External links

1986 births
Living people
Spanish footballers
Footballers from Barcelona
Association football midfielders
La Liga players
Segunda División players
Segunda División B players
Tercera División players
RCD Espanyol B footballers
RCD Espanyol footballers
RCD Mallorca players
Elche CF players
Granada CF footballers
Gimnàstic de Tarragona footballers
North American Soccer League players
New York Cosmos (2010) players
Catalonia international footballers
Spanish expatriate footballers
Expatriate soccer players in the United States
Spanish expatriate sportspeople in the United States